Carl Klingborg (born April 8, 1986) is a Swedish Bandy player who currently plays for IK Sirius as a forward. Carl began his career at Vetlanda BK.

His list of clubs is as follows-
 Vetlanda BK (2003-2004)
 Hammarby IF Bandy (2004-2006)
 Sköndals IK (2004-2005)
 GT-76 (2005-2006)
 IK Sirius (2006-)

References

External links
  carl klingborg at bandysidan
  ik sirius

Swedish bandy players
Living people
1986 births
Vetlanda BK players
Hammarby IF Bandy players
IK Sirius players